Fergus Ignatius Bourke (31 July 1934 – 8 October 2004) was an Irish photographer. He was a member of Aosdána, an association of Irish artists.

Early life
Bourke was born in Bray in 1934 to Eileen (Eibhlín) Bourke (née Somers) and Thomas Bourke (Tómas de Búrca), who was related to Brendan Behan, Kathleen Behan and Peadar Kearney. His younger brother Brian Bourke was a noted painter. Fergus spent some of his childhood in County Wexford, then attended Presentation College Bray. After that he worked a variety of jobs, and was a stuntman in the film King of Kings (1961), filmed in Spain where Bourke was working as an English teacher.

Career

On returning to Dublin, Bourke was at a party and picked up a copy Henri Cartier-Bresson's The Decisive Moment (Images à la sauvette), which caused him to develop an interest in black-and-white photography. An exhibition at the Project Arts Centre in 1968 led to his work becoming known in the US; the Museum of Modern Art (New York) bought seven of his photos for its permanent collection.

Bourke was renowned as a photographer of Dublin street scenes in the 1960s, depicting the tenements and children's street culture. He was also a photo-journalist, documenting poverty in the 1970s. He was also a portraitist, and documented all major productions in the Abbey Theatre between 1970 and 1995.

Bourke was elected to Aosdána in 1981. He held a major retrospective at the Gallery of Photography in Temple Bar in 2003, and later in the Galway Arts Centre.

Personal life

He married Maureen O'Connor, an Irish-American from Maplewood, New Jersey, in 1963; they had four children. They lived in Sandymount from 1963 until 1992, when they moved to Connemara. Bourke died in 2004; his widow donated his remaining prints to the National Photographic Archive.

References

External links

1934 births
2004 deaths
Aosdána members
21st-century Irish photographers
20th-century Irish photographers
Fine art photographers
Portrait photographers
Theatrical photographers
People educated at Presentation College, Bray
People from Sandymount
People from Bray, County Wicklow